The term swiftboating (also swift-boating or swift boating) is a pejorative American neologism used to describe an unfair or untrue political attack. The term is derived from the name of the organization "Swift Boat Veterans for Truth" (SBVT, later the Swift Vets and POWs for Truth) because of their widely publicized—and later discredited—campaign against 2004 U.S. presidential candidate John Kerry.

Since the political smear campaign that the group conducted against Kerry, the term has come into common use to refer to a harsh attack by a political opponent that is dishonest, personal, and unfair. The Swift Boat Veterans and media pundits objected to this use of the term to define a smear campaign.

Origin
The term "Swift Boat" itself refers to a class of United States Navy vessel used during the Vietnam War. During the 2004 presidential campaign, John Kerry's heroism under fire as a Swift Boat commander in Vietnam was a centerpiece of his campaign. A number of Vietnam veterans who had served on Swift Boats formed a 527 organization called Swift Boat Veterans for Truth (later renamed Swift Vets and POWs for Truth or SVPT) with the intent of discrediting his military record and attacking his subsequent antiwar activities as a member of Vietnam Veterans Against the War. The group produced a series of television ads and a bestselling book, Unfit for Command. The unsubstantiated charges against Kerry by the SVPT gave rise to the term "swiftboating" as a synonym for "the nastiest of campaign smears", "a slimy political attack", and, for many, "ugly, unprincipled slander". As the purpose of a tax-exempt 527 organization is "to focus on the issues" rather than "attack or defend a specific candidate", the SBVT was fined by the Federal Election Commission in 2004 for specifically attacking Kerry instead of focusing on political issues.

Later use
Charges of "swiftboating" were made by supporters of both major candidates in the 2012 presidential election. Republican Party strategists compared attacks on Mitt Romney's tenure at Bain Capital to swiftboating: "It's very clear they are trying to re-create and take a page out for the 2004 Bush campaign." The term was also used by a representative of Barack Obama's re-election campaign to describe the documentary film Dishonorable Disclosures and an associated ad campaign released by the Special Operations OPSEC Education Fund on the topic of the death of Osama bin Laden.

The feminist Gloria Steinem has accused Donald Trump of swiftboating his rival Hillary Clinton during the 2016 presidential race, calling her 'Crooked Hillary', despite his record of much more frequent and severe lying.

Hillary Clinton compared Republicans' statements about Christine Blasey Ford during the Kavanaugh confirmation process to  the "swift-boating of John Kerry".

The New York Times reported in 2008 that many Swift Boat veterans, "especially those who had nothing to do with the group that attacked Senator John Kerry's military record in the 2004 election—want their good name back, and the good names of the men not lucky enough to come home alive", expressed regret and dismay that the term "swift boat" has come to represent a political attack and "political chicanery" against a member of a different party.

Conservative objections and use
The use of this term as a pejorative has resulted in objections from some conservatives who object to the implied criticism of the tactics used by Swift Vets and POWs for Truth.

In 2006, conservative commentator Emmett Tyrrell denounced its repeated negative usage, saying it "is about to join such terms as McCarthyism and McCarthyite" as a "hate term". In a 2006 interview, John O'Neill, spokesman for Swift Vets and POWs for Truth, called the term's usage a "baseless smear against somebody's personal character".

Republican Newt Gingrich, putting his own twist on the neologism at a presidential campaign stop on January 1, 2012, said he felt he was being "Romney-boated" by the barrage of negative ads run against him. Fox News Radio host John Gibson has written a book titled How the Left Swiftboated America, in which he defines swiftboating as "the political trick of claiming to expose truth while in fact lying".

See also
 John Kerry military service controversy
 Borking, another political neologism
 Astroturfing

References

Political terminology of the United States
Political campaign techniques